Jungle Jack may refer to:

 "Jungle Jack" Hanna, an American zoo keeper and animal expert.
 Jungledyret Hugo, a Danish cartoon character sometimes translated "Jungle Jack" or "Amazon Jack".